Meterana coctilis is a species of moth in the family Noctuidae. This species is endemic to New Zealand.

References

Noctuinae
Moths of New Zealand
Endemic fauna of New Zealand
Moths described in 1931
Taxa named by Edward Meyrick
Endemic moths of New Zealand